The 2002 Swisscom Challenge was a women's tennis tournament played on indoor hard courts. It was the 19th edition of the event known as the Zurich Open, and was part of the Tier I Series of the 2002 WTA Tour. It took place at the Schluefweg in Zürich, Switzerland, from 13 October through 20 October 2002. Unseeded Patty Schnyder won the singles title.

Finals

Singles

 Patty Schnyder defeated  Lindsay Davenport, 6–7(5–7), 7–6(10–8), 6–3

Doubles

 Elena Bovina /  Justine Henin defeated  Jelena Dokic /  Nadia Petrova, 6–2, 7–6(7–2)

References

External links
 ITF tournament edition details
 Tournament draws

Swisscom Challenge
2002
2002 in Swiss tennis
October 2002 sports events in Europe
2002 in Swiss women's sport